William Carver may refer to:
William Carver (politician) (1868–1961), British Conservative Party politician, Member of Parliament (MP) for Howdenshire 1926–1947
William Carver (Wild Bunch) (1868–1901), American outlaw during the closing years of the Old West
William Frank Carver (1840–1927), US sharpshooter